Tajuria matsutaroi is a butterfly of the family Lycaenidae first described by Hisakazu Hayashi in 1984. It is endemic to the Philippine islands of Mindanao and Leyte. Forewing length is about 16–19 mm. The butterfly is a rare species. The nominotypical subspecies is found only on Mount Apo on Mindanao island and occurs several times a year.

Subspecies
Tajuria matsutaroi matsutaroi H. Hayashi, [1984] (Mindanao island)
Tajuria matsutaroi motokoae H. Hayashi, [2011] (Leyte island)

References

, 1984: A New Tajuria (Lepidoptera, Lycaenidae) from Mindanao. Tyô to Ga. 34 (3): 127–129. .
, 1995. Checklist of the butterflies of the Philippine Islands (Lepidoptera: Rhopalocera). Nachrichten des Entomologischen Vereins Apollo, Suppl. 14: 7–118.

,2012: Revised checklist of the butterflies of the Philippine Islands. Nachrichten des Entomologischen Vereins Apollo, Suppl. 20: 1-64.

Butterflies described in 1984
Tajuria